The Norwegian Telecom Museum (Telemuseet, formerly Norsk Telemuseum) was a Norwegian museum with a collection and several exhibits, including a permanent exhibit at the Norwegian Museum of Science and Technology. The administration of the Norwegian Telecom Museum was maintained in  the Kjelsås neighbourhoods of Oslo.

The museum operated nationwide, with exhibitions and collections in several  places. The main exhibition of the museum was located in the Norwegian Museum of Science and Technology  at Kjelsås in Oslo. Other location sites include Stavanger, Jeløy, Kristiansand. Lier, Lærdal, Lødingen, Sørvågen, Tromsø and Trondheim.

The museum was mainly funded by the Telenor Group. In April 2017, Telenor announced that it would no longer finance the operation of the museum, which would be closed from January 2018. Applications were made for operating funds from the State, but in the state budget for 2018 no money was set aside for the Telemuseet . The museum was therefore merged with the Norwegian Museum of Science and Technology with effect from 1 January 2018.

References

External links
Telemuseet website

Museums in Oslo
Defunct museums
Science museums in Norway
Telecom
Museums disestablished in 2018